The Yale Corporation, officially The President and Fellows of Yale College, is the governing body of Yale University in New Haven, Connecticut.

Assembly of corporation
The Corporation comprises 19 members:

 Three ex officio members: the President of the University and the Governor and the Lieutenant Governor of the State of Connecticut.
 Ten "Successor Trustees" who elect their own successors.
 Six Alumni Fellows who are elected by the body of Yale alumni.

While Article 8 Section 3 of the Constitution of the State of Connecticut recognizes a 1792 Act of the Connecticut General Assembly, which established the governor, lieutenant governor, and six members of the State Senate as ex officio members of the Corporation, an 1871 act of the Connecticut Legislature gave Yale alumni the right to elect the six posts formerly occupied by state senators. As explained by 20th-century Yale historian George Pierson:
In the 1750s President Clap did cause or engineer two great breaks: the separation of the College from the churches by the setting up of an independent college church, and separation of the College from the state by the refusal of inspection and termination of colony support. But the second separation proved unsuccessful. So Stiles and his trustees had to bring political authorities back into the management of the College by adding the governor, lieutenant governor, and six senior assistants to the Fellows of the Corporation in return for some monies and for the confirmation of the colonial charter. So, whatever the traditions or later assumptions, Yale College would not find itself operationally free from political supervision until 1872, when by law six alumni fellows or trustees were allowed to be substituted for the six senior senators of the Corporation.

In the late nineteenth century, it became a point of debate whether the Successor Trustees needed to remain Connecticut ministers. In 1905, the trustees selected their first non-minister successor, Payson Merrill. By 1917, half the Successor Trustees were laypersons.

List of corporation members
The Members of the Yale Corporation were the following and had the following roles as of May 2021, according to the Yale University webpages concerning the Corporation:

Notes

References
 Pierson, George Wilson. (1988). The Founding of Yale: the Legend of the Forty Folios. New Haven: Yale University Press. ; OCLC 17872942

External links
Yale Corporation membership
The Bylaws of the Yale Corporation

Yale University
Governing bodies of universities and colleges in the United States